Comitas trailli is a species of sea snails, a marine gastropod mollusc in the family Pseudomelatomidae, the turrids and allies.

Description
The length of the shell attains 28 mm, its diameter 10 mm.

The fusiform shell has an acute spire. The whorls are slightly carinated with fine spiral lines and transverse ribs anteriorly. The posterior part is smooth. The aperture is ovate. The siphonal canal is rather produced. The body whorl is shorter than the spire.

Distribution
This marine species is endemic to New Zealand and occurs off South Island where fossils have been found in Tertiary strata.

References

 Maxwell, P.A. (2009). Cenozoic Mollusca. pp 232–254 in Gordon, D.P. (ed.) New Zealand inventory of biodiversity. Volume one. Kingdom Animalia: Radiata, Lophotrochozoa, Deuterostomia. Canterbury University Press, Christchurch.
 Spencer, H.G., Marshall, B.A. & Willan, R.C. (2009). Checklist of New Zealand living Mollusca. pp 196–219. in: Gordon, D.P. (ed.) New Zealand inventory of biodiversity. Volume one. Kingdom Animalia: Radiata, Lophotrochozoa, Deuterostomia. Canterbury University Press, Christchurch

External links
 
 Powell A. W. B., New Zealand Mollusca, William Collins Publishers Ltd, Auckland, New Zealand 1979 
 Bruce A. Marshall, Molluscan and brachiopod taxa introduced by F. W. Hutton in The New Zealand journal of science; Journal of the Royal Society of New Zealand, Volume 25, Issue 4, 1995
 Spencer H.G., Willan R.C., Marshall B.A. & Murray T.J. (2011). Checklist of the Recent Mollusca Recorded from the New Zealand Exclusive Economic Zone
 Auckland War Memorial Museum: Comitas trailli

trailli
Gastropods described in 1873
Gastropods of New Zealand